Nick Fisher (born 1 May 1981) is an Australian freestyle skier. He competed in the men's moguls event at the 2006 Winter Olympics.

References

External links
 

1981 births
Living people
Australian male freestyle skiers
Olympic freestyle skiers of Australia
Freestyle skiers at the 2006 Winter Olympics
Sportspeople from Adelaide